We Will Channel You was a South Korean television program that aired on SBS every Thursday at 23:10 (KST) beginning November 15, 2018, and ended of May 9, 2019. A pilot episode, as a Chuseok special, was aired on September 25, 2018 at 23:00 (KST).

On February 25, 2019 it was confirmed that Kim Jong-min and So Yoo-jin would join the fixed cast of the show.

Overview
The program mainly focuses on celebrities becoming video contents creators, making their own videos based on their own themes. They will also observe these created videos and their production processes of their own videos in the studio.

Starting from episode 15, the program is reformatted to a talk show with 2 fixed segments, with one being hosted by Kang Ho-dong and Yang Se-hyung, the other hosted by Kim Jong-min and So Yoo-jin.

Cast

Current
 Kang Ho-dong (Pilot episode, Regular episodes 1-23)
 Yang Se-hyung (Pilot episode, Regular episodes 1-23)
 Kim Jong-min (Regular episodes 15-23)
 So Yoo-jin (Regular episodes 15-23)

Former
Lee Young-ae (Pilot episode)
 Ddotty (Regular episodes 1-10)
 Seungri (Big Bang) (Regular episodes 1-12)

Channels opened

Episodes

2018

2019

Ratings 
 In the ratings below, the highest rating for the show will be in red, and the lowest rating for the show will be in blue each year.
 NR denotes that the show did not rank in the top 20 daily programs on that date.

2018

2019

Awards and nominations

References

Notes

External links
 on YouTube

South Korean reality television series
2018 South Korean television series debuts
Seoul Broadcasting System original programming
Korean-language television shows
South Korean variety television shows